Munda Majra was a village in tahsil Jagadhri of Yamunanagar district in Haryana, India. The village was merged in the Yamuna Nagar Municipal Corporation and lost its independent identity.

Location 
The population of the village Munda Majra is primarily located in-between Tejli Sports stadium on the North, Shashtri Colony on South, Western Yamuna Canal on East and Model Colony on the West side.

Founder 
This village was founded by Sh. Jodha Jat, a Hindu. During ancient times, the entire area of this village was lying unattended (Bila-Tardud) and barren (Banjar). It was around the 15th century BC that after taking permission and entering into an agreement with the Ruler of the Day, the 'Laller gotra', 'Dahiya gotra' and 'Sangwan gotra' people of the Jat community inhabited and settled in this village and took possession of the barren land to make it cultivable, with ownership rights, that is, 16 'Hals' of 'Dahiya-Patti' and 16 'Hals' of 'Sangwan-Patti' out of total 32 'Hals' as total land of the village. Jai Paul Singh Dahiya, an IAS (Retd) belongs to this village.

Villages in Yamunanagar district